Der lachende Mann – Bekenntnisse eines Mörders  is an East German film. It was released in 1966. The title translates into English as The Laughing Man – Confessions of a Murderer.

Plot
Posing as West German journalists, East German documentary filmmakers  and  pay a visit to the notorious Nazi-turned-mercenary Siegfried “Kongo” Müller and interviewed him about his life and his participation in Congo's civil war.

References

External links
 
 http://anthologyfilmarchives.org/film_screenings/calendar?view=list&month=07&year=2011#showing-37679

1966 films
1966 documentary films
German documentary films
East German films
1930s German-language films
Films about mercenaries
1960s German films
1930s German films